Tawsif Mahbub is a Bangladeshi born actor who has performed in many of television dramas.

Early life
Tawsif Mahbub completed a BSc in electrical and electronic engineering at American International University-Bangladesh in 2011 before turning to acting.

Television

Web series
 List (2017)
 Abashik Hotel (2018)

References

Further reading

External links
 

21st-century Bangladeshi male actors
Bangladeshi male television actors
Living people
American International University-Bangladesh alumni
1988 births